This is a list of the bird species recorded of Bouvet Island. The avifauna of Bouvet Island include a total of 40 species. 

This list's taxonomic treatment (designation and sequence of orders, families and species) and nomenclature (common and scientific names) follow the conventions of The Clements Checklist of Birds of the World, 2022 edition. The family accounts at the beginning of each heading reflect this taxonomy, as do the species counts found in each family account. Introduced and accidental species are included in the total counts for Bouvet Island.

The following tags have been used to highlight several categories. The commonly occurring native species do not fall into any of these categories.

(A) Accidental - a species that rarely or accidentally occurs on Bouvet Island

Skuas and jaegers
Order: CharadriiformesFamily: Stercorariidae

The family Stercorariidae are, in general, medium to large birds, typically with grey or brown plumage, often with white markings on the wings. They nest on the ground in temperate and arctic regions and are long-distance migrants.

South polar skua, Stercorarius maccormicki 
Brown skua, Stercorarius antarctica
Parasitic jaeger, Stercorarius parasiticus

Gulls, terns, and skimmers
Order: CharadriiformesFamily: Laridae

Laridae is a family of medium to large seabirds, the gulls, terns, and skimmers. Gulls are typically grey or white, often with black markings on the head or wings. They have stout, longish bills and webbed feet. Terns are a group of generally medium to large seabirds typically with grey or white plumage, often with black markings on the head. Most terns hunt fish by diving but some pick insects off the surface of fresh water. Terns are generally long-lived birds, with several species known to live in excess of 30 years.

Kelp gull, Larus dominicanus (A)
Arctic tern, Sterna paradisaea
Antarctic tern, Sterna vittata

Penguins
Order: SphenisciformesFamily: Spheniscidae

The penguins are a group of aquatic, flightless birds living almost exclusively in the Southern Hemisphere. Most penguins feed on krill, fish, squid and other forms of sealife caught while swimming underwater.

King penguin, Aptenodytes patagonicus 
Adelie penguin, Pygoscelis adeliae
Gentoo penguin, Pygoscelis papua
Chinstrap penguin, Pygoscelis antarctica
Macaroni penguin, Eudyptes chrysolophus

Albatrosses
Order: ProcellariiformesFamily: Diomedeidae

The albatrosses are among the largest of flying birds, and the great albatrosses from the genus Diomedea have the largest wingspans of any extant birds.

Yellow-nosed albatross, Thalassarche chlororhynchos (A) 
Gray-headed albatross, Thalassarche chrysostoma (A)
Black-browed albatross, Thalassarche melanophris
Sooty albatross, Phoebetria fusca (A)
Light-mantled albatross, Phoebetria palpebrata
Royal albatross, Diomedea epomophora (A)
Wandering albatross, Diomedea exulans

Southern storm-petrels
Order: ProcellariiformesFamily: Oceanitidae

The southern storm-petrels are relatives of the petrels and are the smallest seabirds. They feed on planktonic crustaceans and small fish picked from the surface, typically while hovering. The flight is fluttering and sometimes bat-like.

Wilson's storm-petrel, Oceanites oceanicus
Black-bellied storm-petrel, Fregetta tropica

Shearwaters and petrels
Order: ProcellariiformesFamily: Procellariidae

The procellariids are the main group of medium-sized "true petrels", characterised by united nostrils with medium septum and a long outer functional primary.

Southern giant-petrel, Macronectes giganteus
Northern giant-petrel, Macronectes halli
Southern fulmar, Fulmarus glacialoides
Antarctic petrel, Thalassoica antarctica
Cape petrel, Daption capense 
Snow petrel, Pagodroma nivea
Kerguelen petrel, Aphrodroma brevirostris
Great-winged petrel, Pterodroma macroptera (A)
Soft-plumaged petrel, Pterodroma mollis 
White-headed petrel, Pterodroma lessonii
Blue petrel, Halobaena caerulea
Fairy prion, Pachyptila turtur
Broad-billed prion, Pachyptila vittata
Antarctic prion, Pachyptila desolata
Slender-billed prion, Pachyptila belcheri
Gray petrel, Procellaria cinerea
White-chinned petrel, Procellaria aequinoctialis
Great shearwater, Ardenna gravis
Sooty shearwater, Ardenna grisea 
Common diving-petrel, Pelecanoides urinatrix

See also
List of birds
Lists of birds by region

References

Bouvet Island